Mamadou Gassama Cissokho (born 28 October 1993) is a Spanish handball player for BM Granollers.
 	
His sister Kaba Gassama is also a handball player, and his brother, Sekou Gassama, is a footballer.

References 	

 
	
Living people	
Sportspeople from Granollers
1993 births	
Spanish male handball players	
Handball players from Catalonia	
Spanish people of Senegalese descent
Spanish sportspeople of African descent
Liga ASOBAL players
BM Granollers players